Xingang Fengtian Temple, sometimes romanized as Fongtian Temple, is a temple located in Xingang Township, Chiayi County, Taiwan. The temple is a county-level monument and the destination of the annual Dajia Mazu Pilgrimage.

History 

Bengang is the historical name of a major port city along the Beigang River which flourished as both a trade center and a pirate's haven. In 1700, a temple named Tianhou Temple was founded in the city and dedicated to Mazu. However, the Bengang was very prone to flooding, and a flood in 1799 destroyed Tianhou Temple completely. In Xingang, the relics were temporarily stored inside a small Tudigong temple.

In 1811, Xingang residents built Fengtian Temple to house the rescued relics under the leadership of Qing general Wang De-lu. Even with the agreement, the two temples are still at odds to this day.

In 1905, Fengtian Temple was destroyed due to earthquake damage.

On August 18, 1985, Fengtian Temple was protected as a county-level monument for its "historical, cultural, and artistic value."

In 1988, the Dajia Mazu Pilgrimage changed its destination from Chaotian Temple to Fengtian Temple. That year, Dajia's Jenn Lann Temple made changes to the pilgrimage that implied seniority over Chaotian Temple, which angered the latter. Fengtian Temple officials proposed that the pilgrimage should end in Xingang instead, and the pilgrimage has never returned to Beigang ever since.

Architecture 

Fengtian Temple is a south-facing complex on County Highway 164 inside downtown Xingang. There are three halls on the central axis: the Sanchuan Hall, Main Haill (for Mazu), and the Rear Hall (for Guanyin). There is one flanking hall on each side housing Wenchang Dijun, Guan Yu, Chenghuangye, and Huye. A modern, four-story hall in the far back contains a variety of other deities. 

As with most temples in Taiwan, the temple is built in the Hokkien architectural style. The street-facing Sanchuan Hall, designed by Wu Haitong, has Cochin ware decorations on the swallowtail roof and stone pillars inscribed with various religious symbols.

Traditions 

Near Lantern Festival, a statue of Mazu is placed in a litter and paraded through Xingang. The ceremony is recognized as an intangible cultural heritage in Chiayi County.

In Taiwanese folk religion, Huye (虎爺) is a tutelary deity in the form of a tiger, said to be the protector of children. In Fengtian Temple, Huye is worshipped on its own altar in the right flanking hall, which differs from most temples that place it at the base of other deities's altars.

Japanese plaque 
Fengtian Temple possesses a gold plated plaque from the Imperial House of Japan dating from 1928. The plaque was crafted in Myōshin-ji in Kyoto as a Japanization campaign and was gifted to twenty major temples across Taiwan. Fengtian Temple's plaque is considered the best-preserved copy in Taiwan.

Gallery

Notes

References 

1811 establishments in Taiwan
Religious buildings and structures completed in 1811
Temples in Chiayi County
Historic sites in Taiwan